Emmaus Bible College can refer to:

 Emmaus Baptist College in Brandon, Florida
 Emmaus Bible College (Iowa)
 Emmaus Bible College (Australia)